Octane Render is an unbiased rendering application with real-time capability developed by graphics software company OTOY Inc. It was created by Terrence Vergauwen of the New Zealand based startup company Refractive Software LTD before being sold to OTOY Inc. in 2012.   Octane render was the first commercially available unbiased raytracer that fully utilized the GPU, allowing users to modify scenes close to real time without the speed malus of CPU rendering. 

Octane Render runs on Nvidia's CUDA technology when using Nvidia GPU video cards; Octane X for macOS Big Sur runs on Metal on AMD, Intel Skylake and Apple M1 graphics cards.

References

External links
Official Octane Render site

Rendering systems
2009 software
3D rendering software for Linux